Michael Herbick is an American sound engineer. He has been nominated for five Academy Awards in the category Best Sound. He has worked on over 90 films since 1988.

Selected filmography
 The Fugitive (1993)
 Clear and Present Danger (1994)
 The Shawshank Redemption (1994)
 Batman Forever (1995)
 The Green Mile (1999)

References

External links

Year of birth missing (living people)
Living people
American audio engineers
Emmy Award winners
Best Sound BAFTA Award winners
Place of birth missing (living people)